Saveh County (Ŝahrestāne Sāweh) is in Markazi province, Iran. The capital of the county is the city of Saveh. At the 2006 census, the county's population was 235,843 in 63,672 households. The following census in 2011 counted 259,030 people in 75,650 households. At the 2016 census, the county's population was 283,538 in 87,444 households.

Administrative divisions

The population history and structural changes of Saveh County's administrative divisions over three consecutive censuses are shown in the following table. The latest census shows two districts, seven rural districts, and four cities.

Gallery

References

 

Counties of Markazi Province